"Happy People" is a song by Dominican–American reggae/ragga recording artist Prince Ital Joe featuring American rapper Marky Mark. It is their first single as a duo, released in November 1993 as the lead single from their first and only album, Life in the Streets (1994). Produced by Alex Christensen and Frank Peterson, it became a hit all over Europe, peaking at number four in Germany. It sold over 400.000 copies there, earning the duo a gold record. Additionally, it was a top 10 hit in Finland and a top 30 hit in Austria, Sweden and Switzerland. On the Eurochart Hot 100, the single peaked at number 22. The accompanying music video was A-listed on Germany's VIVA in February 1994.

Critical reception
Pan-European magazine Music & Media said, "The busy signal of a telephone drives you wild before the chorus starts, where "all the lonely people" out of the Beatles' Eleanor Rigby suddenly become "happy"." Miranda Watson wrote, "Happy People is a strongly raggainfluenced track with a driving dance beat, a solid hook balanced by rapping from Marky Mark."

Track listing
 CD maxi, Germany (1993)
"Happy People" (Radio Edit) – 3:59
"Happy People" (Long Version) – 5:55
"Happy People" (Ragga Version) – 5:59

Charts

Weekly charts

Year-end charts

References

 

1993 debut singles
1993 songs
Eurodance songs
Mark Wahlberg songs
Prince Ital Joe songs
Song recordings produced by Alex Christensen
Song recordings produced by Frank Peterson
Songs written by Mark Wahlberg